is a railway station in the city of Kiyosu, Aichi Prefecture,  Japan, operated by Meitetsu.

Lines

Station layout
The station has two above-ground island platforms with and underground station building. The station has automated ticket machines, Manaca automated turnstiles and is staffed.

Platforms

Adjacent stations

Station history
It was renamed to its present name on May 16, 1948. The station building was relocated underground in 1975.

Passenger statistics
In fiscal 2013, the station was used by an average of 7,853 passengers daily.

Surrounding area
 former Kiyosu Town Hall
 JR East Kiyosu Station

See also
 List of Railway Stations in Japan

References

External links

 Official web page 

Railway stations in Japan opened in 1928
Railway stations in Aichi Prefecture
Stations of Nagoya Railroad
Kiyosu, Aichi